Harrison Plaza (HP) was a shopping mall situated along Harrison Avenue corner Pablo Ocampo Street in the district of Malate in Manila, Philippines. Opened in 1976 and closed in 2019, it was the first modern and major shopping mall located in the area. The shopping mall building has been demolished to give way for a redevelopment of the site into residential building complex with a shopping center by SM Prime Holdings.

History

First opening

The property was built in a former cemetery, which was destroyed during World War II, and cleared of graves afterwards. Before the development, the area used to be known as Fort San Antonio Abad in Malate, Manila, Harrison Park, and Ermita Cemetery, respectively.

Harrison Plaza opened in 1976 and was the first modern shopping mall in the Philippines after the opening of Ali Mall. The Martel family leased the lot on the place where the mall is standing under the contract with the city government of Manila. Despite being built on the site of a former cemetery, very few urban legends involved the place. The retail center was the first air-conditioned shopping mall in the Philippines.

Fire, two-year closure, second opening
After the mall was razed by a fire the shopping mall was shuttered for renovations which was done from 1982 and 1984. When it was reopened to the public in 1984, the mall featured a cinema, amusement rides, Jai alai fronton site (until it was converted to SM Hypermarket in 2010), a fountain, a Roman Catholic chapel and a hotel in the 1990s. It was anchored by the country's major Department Store chains like SM Department Store and Rustan's.

Decline
With the rise of new malls built by SM, Ayala, Robinsons, and Megaworld as well as a makeover of Ali Mall, the Harrison Plaza suddenly became a decaying, squalor and disorderly mall and had lost its glory days due to the mismanagement or bad maintenance from the Martel family. This led the Martels to consider selling the property.

In June 2016, it was reported that SM Prime Holdings is planning to invest  to redevelop the mall and planned to put up business process outsourcing offices and residential towers in the Harrison Plaza complex. The firm is partnering with the city government of Manila which has economic interest from the redevelopment project.

In April 2018, SM Prime Holdings was finalizing a deal to buy out the Martel family from its contract with the City of Manila to redevelop and manage Harrison Plaza. Since the shopping center was in need of redevelopment and lagged behind other malls in the metro, SM Prime Holdings plans to build a new shopping center with a residential condominium above it. The Martel family's contract of the mall would expire by 2020 or 2022.

Closure and sale to SM

On November 14, 2019, the Martels gave notice to the mall's tenants that the mall would cease its operations on December 31, 2019 with the family giving them time to clear out the area until January 31, 2020. 

After the deadline, the property will be demolished to give way for a "massive project" of SM Prime Holdings, reportedly a condominium building complex with a shopping center or mall similar to The Podium. The structure was demolished by October 2021 in preparation for construction.

Tenants

At its peak, the Harrison Plaza housed 180 stores, eateries, and service outlets. It also had four movie houses and a supermarket. It also had a jai alai fronton prior to the sports' ban by the national government. The sports venue was replaced by an outlet of SM Hypermarket.

In popular culture
 The 2019 Star Cinema film The Mall, The Merrier starring Vice Ganda and Anne Curtis was largely filmed in and around Harrison Plaza where it was used to portray the fictional Tamol Mall, where mysterious incidents occur.

See also
 Ali Mall
 List of largest shopping malls
 List of largest shopping malls in the Philippines
 List of shopping malls in Metro Manila

References

External links

Shopping malls in Manila
Buildings and structures in Malate, Manila
Shopping malls established in 1976
Defunct shopping malls
Shopping malls disestablished in 2019
Buildings and structures demolished in 2021